Incurvaria masculella, the feathered diamond-back, is a moth of the family Incurvariidae. It is found in Europe.

The wingspan is 12–16 mm.Head pale ochreous, ferruginous-tinged. Forewings rather dark purplish bronzy-fuscous ; a whitish triangular dorsal spot before middle, and a smaller one before tornus. Hindwings rather dark grey. The moth flies from April to June depending on the location.

The larvae feed on oak, sweet chestnut, Corylus avellana, Tilia, Carpinus betulus, rose, Vaccinium and Crataegus.

References

External links

 Incurvaria masculella at UKmoths
 Lepidoptera of Belgium
 Lepiforum.de
 Bladmineerders.nl 

Incurvariidae
Moths described in 1775
Moths of Europe
Taxa named by Michael Denis
Taxa named by Ignaz Schiffermüller